Idiazabal is a pressed cheese made from unpasteurized sheep milk, usually from Latxa and Carranzana sheep in the Basque Country and Navarre. It has a somewhat smokey flavor, but is usually un-smoked.

The cheese is handmade and covered in a hard, dark brown, inedible rind. It is aged for a few months and develops a nutty, buttery flavor, eaten fresh, often with quince jam. If aged longer, it becomes firm, dry and sharp and can be used for grating.

The Denomination of Origin for Idiazabal cheese was created in 1987 and defines the basic regulations for the product's manufacture. Typically, unpasteurized milk from latxa breed of sheep is used, although in some cases the D.O. permits the use of milk from Carranzana breed, from the Encartaciones in Biscay. The D.O. also stipulates that the milk be curdled with the natural lamb rennet, and permits external smoking of the cheese. The cheeses produced in the following towns in accordance with all the D.O. regulations, are therefore also protected by the Idiazabal D.O. : Urbia, Entzia, Gorbea, Orduña, Urbasa and Aralar. Recently some Basque Country farmers have begun to use hybrid Assaf sheep, which some maintain does not meet the Denomination of Origin for the cheese.

Production process
Idiazabal is an aged cheese, from semi-cured to cured, made exclusively from whole unpasteurized sheep's milk. It is produced by strong enzymatic coagulation. The pressed paste can be either uncooked or semi-cooked. It can eventually be externally smoked.

The milk used to produce Idiazabal must be whole unpasteurized, with a minimum of 6% fat.

In the case of coagulation at higher temperatures, the reheating temperature can reach . The reheated and shrunken paste dehydrates and is placed in molds where it may or may not be seasoned before pressing. Salting of the cheese is performed by rubbing the rind with dry salt or immersing the cheese in highly salted water for 24 hours. Finally, the cheeses are aged under cold and humid conditions avoiding mold, for at least two months.

The optional smoking takes place at the end of the aging process, using woods from the beech-tree, birch-tree, cherry tree or white pine. The intensity of the smoked qualities depends upon the type of wood and length of smoking. The cheeses are usually cylindrical in shape, although they are occasionally cone- or octagonal-shaped. The rinds of artisan cheeses may be engraved with drawings or symbols characteristic of the Basque culture. The rind is closed, smoked, waxy, without mold. The unsmoked cheeses have a yellow-beige color, while smoked cheeses are brownish.

The interior is compact, without air pockets or with only pin-head size holes, and is beige or pale yellow in color. The interior of the smoked cheeses has a brownish border. The taste is strong and pronounced, slightly acidic and piquant, buttery and consistent, with a characteristic sheep milk flavor. The smoked version is somewhat drier and stronger, with a pleasant aroma.

See also
Ossau-Iraty

References

Idiazabal cheese
Idiazabal

External links
Idiazabal Official Site
Idiazabal Official Shop

Cheeses with designation of origin protected in the European Union
Spanish cheeses
Basque cuisine
Sheep's-milk cheeses
Spanish products with protected designation of origin
Smoked cheeses